1977 Bihar Legislative Assembly election was held in 1977 to elect members to the Bihar Legislative Assembly in the state of Bihar, India. The Janata Party's decisive victories in the state and political elections ensured Chief Minister Karpoori Thakur's victory.

Results

Elected members

References

1977
1977
Bihar